is a former Japanese discus thrower.

She competed the 1936 Summer Olympics, placing fourth.

In 1935 she became Japanese champion.

References

External links
 

1920 births
Possibly living people
Japanese female discus throwers
Olympic female discus throwers
Olympic athletes of Japan
Athletes (track and field) at the 1936 Summer Olympics
Japan Championships in Athletics winners
20th-century Japanese women